The Boston University Terriers women’s basketball team is the college basketball program representing Boston University in Boston, Massachusetts. The Terriers currently participate as part of the NCAA Division I basketball, and compete in the Patriot League. The Terriers currently play their home games at Case Gym.

History
Since beginning play in 1975, the Terriers have an all-time record of 571-564. Boston University won the America East Conference women's basketball tournament thrice in their time in the conference (1988, 1989, 2003, with runner up status in 1986, 1990, 2004-2006, 2008, 2009, 2011). They have played in just one NCAA Tournament, in 2003. In the First Round, they were defeated 91-44 by UConn.

The Terriers are currently coached by second-year head coach Marisa Moseley, who previously served as an assistant coach at UConn under head coach Geno Auriemma for nine seasons.

Prior to Moseley, Katy Steding served as head coach from the 2014-2015 season until Moseley took over in April 2018. Under her guidance, the Terriers had a 31-88 record. Moseley left for Wisconsin in 2021.

Postseason appearances

NCAA Division I

WNIT results

AIAW Division I
The Terriers made one appearance in the AIAW National Division I basketball tournament, with a combined record of 0–1.

References

External links